Christiane Jacox Kyle (born 1950) is an American poet. She is a member of PEN American Center 2006.

Works

Translations

References

1950 births
Living people
American women poets
Yale Younger Poets winners
21st-century American women